Accra amanica is a species of moth of the family Tortricidae. It is found in Tanzania.

The wingspan is about 15 mm. The ground colour of the forewings is greyish green and the costa and termen are ochreous, as well as an edge and row of blackish dots along the apex. The markings are red. The hindwings are brown, but paler basally.

References

Moths described in 2005
Tortricini
Moths of Africa